The 2007 West Somerset District Council election took place on 3 May 2007 to elect members of West Somerset District Council in Somerset, England. The whole council was up for election and independents gained overall control of the council from the Conservative party.

Election result
The Conservatives dropped to 13 seats, a net loss of 4, and fell behind the independents who became the largest group with 16 councillors. Conservative losses included defeats in the seats of Alcombe East, Old Cleeve, Porlock, Quantock Vale and West Quantock, but they did make some gains, including in Watchet where an independent lost a seat. Both the Labour Party and the Liberal Democrats lost a seat, to only have one councillor each. Overall turnout at the election was 46.9%.

Following the election independent councillor Keith Ross became the new leader of the council, taking over from the Conservatives, with Labour councillor Simon Stokes becoming deputy leader.

Ward results

By-elections between 2007 and 2011

Alcombe East

Minehead South

References

2007 English local elections
2007
2000s in Somerset